Mesquite High School may refer to:
 Mesquite High School (Arizona), a high school in Gilbert, Arizona
 Mesquite High School (Texas), a high school in Mesquite, Texas